Trębaczów may refer to the following places:
Trębaczów, Greater Poland Voivodeship (west-central Poland)
Trębaczów, Lublin Voivodeship (east Poland)
Trębaczów, Świętokrzyskie Voivodeship (south-central Poland)